The ChungYuet World Center, also known as ChungYuet TGA or Wyatt World Center, is a skyscraper office building located in Taoyuan District, Taoyuan, Taiwan.

As of December 2020, it is the tallest office building in Taoyuan City, second tallest building in Taoyuan City (after ChungYuet Royal Landmark) and 64th tallest in Taiwan.

See also 
 List of tallest buildings in Asia
 List of tallest buildings in Taiwan
 List of tallest buildings in Taoyuan City
 ChungYuet Royal Landmark
 ChungYuet Global Business Building

References

External links

 

2012 establishments in Taiwan
Skyscraper office buildings in Taiwan
Skyscrapers in Taoyuan
Buildings and structures in Taoyuan City
Office buildings completed in 2012
Neoclassical architecture in Taiwan